John Barr may refer to:
John W. Barr (1826–1907), U.S. federal judge
John Barr (Canadian politician) (1843–1909), Canadian physician and politician
John Barr (New Zealand politician) (1867–1930), member of the New Zealand Legislative Council
John Barr (poet) (1809–1889), New Zealand poet
John Barr (basketball) (1918–2002), American basketball player
John Barr (shinty) (born 1982), Scottish shinty player
John Barr (footballer, born 1885) (1885–?), Scottish footballer (Grimsby Town)
John Barr (footballer, born 1917) (1917–1977), Scottish footballer
John Barr (librarian) (1887–1971), New Zealand librarian
John E. Barr (1913–2010), member of the Governing Body of Jehovah's Witnesses
John Barr, president of Poetry Foundation
John Barr, a fictional character and namesake of the Jonbar hinge concept